Death in Harley Street is a 1946 detective novel by John Rhode, the pen name of the British writer Cecil Street. It is the forty third in his long-running series of novels featuring Lancelot Priestley, a Golden Age armchair detective. Several sources consider it to be the author's masterpiece.

Synopsis
Doctor Richard Mawsley is found dead in the consulting room of his Harley Street practice, apparently from strychnine. Inspector Waghorn of Scotland Yard takes up the case, but it requires the particular brilliance of Priestley to demonstrate that this strange case was neither accident, suicide or murder.

References

Bibliography
 Evans, Curtis. Masters of the "Humdrum" Mystery: Cecil John Charles Street, Freeman Wills Crofts, Alfred Walter Stewart and the British Detective Novel, 1920-1961. McFarland, 2014.
 Herbert, Rosemary. Whodunit?: A Who's Who in Crime & Mystery Writing. Oxford University Press, 2003.
 Magill, Frank Northen . Critical Survey of Mystery and Detective Fiction: Authors, Volume 4. Salem Press, 1988.
 Reilly, John M. Twentieth Century Crime & Mystery Writers. Springer, 2015.

1946 British novels
Novels by Cecil Street
British crime novels
British mystery novels
British detective novels
Geoffrey Bles books
Novels set in London